Robert Browning (1812–1889) was an English poet and playwright.

Robert Browning may also refer to:
 Robert Browning (Byzantinist) (1914–1997), Scottish professor of Byzantine studies
 Robert Barrett Browning (1849–1912), English painter
 Robert X. Browning (21st century), American archivist
 Bob Browning (1888–1949), English footballer with Queens Park Rangers and Southampton
 Robert Browning School, Canada

See also 
 Robert Brunning (1943–2011), British musician
 Christopher Robert Browning (born 1944), American historian of the Holocaust